Papeži is a small village in the Municipality of Osilnica in southern Slovenia. The area is part of the traditional region of Lower Carniola and is now included in the Southeast Slovenia Statistical Region.

The local church in the settlement is dedicated to Saint Michael and belongs to the parish of Osilnica. It dates to the 18th century.

References

External links
Papeži on Geopedia

Populated places in the Municipality of Osilnica